Spinola Battery, also known as Fort Spinola, was an artillery battery in St. Julian's, Malta. It was built by the British between 1889 and 1894, and it was demolished to make way for hotels and a yacht marina.

History
Construction of Spinola Battery began in 1889 and was completed in 1894, at a cost of around £5000. It was part of a new series of fortifications meant to house breech-loading (BL) guns.

Spinola Battery was located behind the Spinola Entrenchment, an 18th-century bastioned entrenchment wall stretching from St. Julian's Bay to St. George's Bay. It had a pentagonal shape, and was armed with four guns, including two 9.2-inch BL guns. Its armament was removed in 1907.

The battery was converted and developed into a hospital, known as the Spinola Hospital, during World War I. It served as a hospital from 16 November 1915 till 27 April 1917. It was designed to serve for roughly 1000 patients, but during the war it had served for a maximum of 1168. The battery saw use again in World War II, when it was armed with 4.5-inch anti-aircraft guns. It was severely damaged by aerial bombardment.

In 1969, it was used as a film sound studio, known as Intermed, later,  as Brittania Studios. The studio was exactly situated behind the Millenium Chapel, now, a supermarket. Some of the films that made use of this sound stage were:
Orca the killer whale, Zeppelin, Murpheys War, The Mcintosh man, Pulp, Raise the Titanic. Actors: Michael Cane, Mickey Roony, Charlotte Ramplin, Paul Newman, Peter O'Toole.

The Hilton Malta Hotel was built in 1967 on the site of the battery. The hotel and any remains of the battery were later completely demolished to make way for the Portomaso Marina and a new Hilton hotel.

Further reading
Details about Spinola Fort and conversion

See also
Spinola Redoubt

References

St. Julian's, Malta
British fortifications in Malta
Batteries in Malta
Buildings and structures completed in 1894
World War II sites in Malta
Buildings and structures demolished in the 20th century
Demolished buildings and structures in Malta
Defunct hospitals in Malta
19th-century fortifications